Ye Xiufeng (1900 – 8 February 1990) was a Kuomintang politician of the Republic of China.

Early life and family origins 

Ye was born in 1900 in Jiangdu, Jiangsu Province during the late Qing Empire. His father was Ye Weishan (zh: 葉惟善), a Yangzhou teacher.

Biography 

Ye Xiufeng was a member of the CC Clique of the Kuomintang. He was acquainted with Chiang Kai-shek and Chen Lifu via his education at the Whampoa Military Academy. After graduating, he pursued a master's degree from the University of Pittsburgh, graduating in 1925.

References 

Members of the Kuomintang
People of the Chinese Civil War
Chinese anti-communists
1900 births
1990 deaths
Taiwanese people from Jiangsu